Ricardo Roberto Toro Vergara (born 20 December 1961) is a Chilean former footballer who played as a centre-back.

Playing career
He played in five matches for the Chile national football team in 1987. He was also part of Chile's squad for the 1987 Copa América tournament.

Coaching career
He worked in the Palestino youth ranks since 1997 until 2007, assuming as interim coach of the first team in 2004.

Then, he worked in the Ñublense youth ranks, performing as interim coach in 2009 and 2010.

References

External links
 
 Ricardo Toro at PartidosdeLaRoja.com 

1961 births
Living people
Footballers from Santiago
Chilean footballers
Chilean expatriate footballers
Chile international footballers
Club Deportivo Palestino footballers
Unión San Felipe footballers
Everton de Viña del Mar footballers
Deportes Temuco footballers
Provincial Osorno footballers
Audax Italiano footballers
C.D. FAS footballers
Chilean Primera División players
Primera B de Chile players
Salvadoran Primera División players
Chilean expatriate sportspeople in El Salvador
Expatriate footballers in El Salvador
Association football defenders
Chilean football managers
Club Deportivo Palestino managers
Ñublense managers
Chilean Primera División managers